The US Yachts US 42 is an American sailboat that was designed by Stan Huntingford as a cruiser and first built in 1982.

The boat is a development of the Cooper 416, using the same molds, which were purchased by Bayliner from Cooper Yachts.

Production
The design was built by US Yachts in the United States, from 1982 to 1986, but it is now out of production.

Design
The US 42 is a recreational keelboat, built predominantly of fiberglass, with wood trim. It has a masthead sloop rig; a raked stem; a raised counter, reverse transom; a skeg-mounted rudder controlled by a wheel and a fixed fin keel. It displaces  and carries  of ballast.

The design has sleeping accommodation for six people, with an angled double berth in the bow cabin, an "L"-shaped settee and a straight settee in the main cabin and an aft cabin with a double berth on the starboard side. The galley is located on the port side just forward of the companionway ladder. The galley is "U"-shaped and is equipped with a three-burner stove and a double sink. The head is located just aft of the bow cabin on the starboard side and includes a shower.

For sailing downwind the design may be equipped with a symmetrical spinnaker.

See also
List of sailing boat types

Related development
Cooper 416

References

Keelboats
1980s sailboat type designs
Sailing yachts 
Sailboat type designs by Stan Huntingford
Sailboat types built by US Yachts